Iwama may refer to:

Iwama, Ibaraki, a former town in Nishiibaraki District, Ibaraki Prefecture, Japan
Iwama Station, a train station in Kasama, Ibaraki Prefecture, Japan
Iwama dojo, an aikido dojo
Iwama style, a style of aikido

People with the surname
, Japanese pole vaulter
, Japanese footballer

Japanese-language surnames